The Namibia national cricket team, nicknamed the Eagles, is the men's team that represents the Republic of Namibia in international cricket. It is organised by Cricket Namibia which became an associate member of the International Cricket Council (ICC) in 1992.

A team representing South West Africa played in South African domestic competitions prior to Namibia's independence in 1990. After joining the ICC the country soon became one of the leading ICC associate members in Africa. Namibia finished second at the 2001 ICC Trophy, thereby qualifying for the 2003 Cricket World Cup in South Africa. The team made its One Day International (ODI) debut at the tournament but failed to win a match. Beginning in 2004, Namibia participated in every edition of the ICC Intercontinental Cup, finishing runner-up in 2007–08. It also featured at the highest levels of the World Cricket League (WCL), twice participating in the WCL Championship, and finished third at the 2012 ICC World Twenty20 Qualifier.

Namibia finished runner-up at the 2019 WCL Division Two tournament to secure ODI status and qualify for 2019–2023 ICC Cricket World Cup League 2. The team finished fourth at the 2019 ICC Men's T20 World Cup Qualifier to qualify for the 2021 ICC Men's T20 World Cup. It subsequently recorded its first World Cup victories, defeating the Netherlands and Ireland in the first round of the tournament to progress to the Super 12 stage.

History

The earliest instance of cricket played in Windhoek dates back to 1909 when South West Africa was very much a German colony. During the First world war (1914), South African troops opened assault in the region. A game of cricket was recorded in the Okonjande prisoner of war camp near Otjiwarongo. South Africa captured South West Africa following Germany's defeat. It came under the League of Nations mandate in the Union of South Africa.

Following this, cricket was regularly played in the Western Province. The South West Africa Cricket Union was formed in 1930 and the first organised matches were played in the region. South West Africa began playing in the South African Country Cricket Association's annual competition in the 1961–62 season.

South West Africa (1961–1989)

South West Africa competed in the South African Country Cricket Association's annual competition between 1961 and 1989. In 1966, the Namibian war of Independence was launched by the People's Liberation Army of Namibia, an armed wing of SWAPO. South West African rebels welcomed the sporting boycott of the South African apartheid regime and lent their support to the "Stop the seventy tour" campaign.

South West Africa played their last domestic season in South Africa in January 1989. In April, PLAN launched its final guerrilla campaign and the South West Africa Cricket Union severed their ties with the South African Cricket Board (SACB).

In November 1989, a Namibian team toured Botswana and played their first international fixture, although the Namibian Cricket Board were not affiliated to the International Cricket Council until 1992.

Initial years
After the Botswana tour, Gloucestershire County Cricket Club visited Namibia in March 1990, taking part in the Independence Day celebrations. This was followed by a visit from The Netherlands in April. Before the formation of the African Cricket Association, the SCSA Zone VI cricket federation was formed after two schoolboy cricket tours between Namibia and Botswana in 1989 and 1990. The inaugural ACA tournament was held in Windhoek in September 1991, with Zambia, Malawi, Namibia, Lesotho and Botswana playing as well as an Oxford University Cricket Club side.

2003 World Cup
The road to the 2003 Cricket World Cup started with the 2001 ICC Trophy in Canada. Namibia reached the final at the Toronto Cricket, Skating and Curling Club, losing to the Netherlands, but still qualifying for their first World Cup. Namibia then hosted the ICC 6 Nations Challenge in April 2002, finishing fourth and had a disappointing Africa Cup campaign that September, finishing fourth in their group and beating only Tanzania, before losing four matches against Zimbabwe A a few weeks later. A tour of Kenya was more successful, as Namibia beat Kenya in a four match one-day series. Following this, Namibia took part in the top level of South African domestic one-day cricket, the Standard Bank Cup, but lost all five of their games. Bangladesh toured in January 2003, winning the five match one-day series 4–1.

The World Cup itself started on 10 February 2003 in Harare with Zimbabwe beating Namibia by 86 runs in Namibia's debut One Day International (ODI).

They went on to lose to Pakistan by 171 runs, before a 55 run defeat at the hands of England in which Namibia performed with some credit, Jan-Berrie Burger winning the man of the match award for his innings of 85 runs that came close to helping the side pull off an unlikely upset. They then lost by 181 runs to India and by 256 runs against Australia, the eventual winners of the tournament, in what at the time was the biggest winning margin in One Day Internationals. The tournament finished with a 64 run loss to fellow qualifiers the Netherlands.

After the World Cup
In August 2003, Zimbabwe A toured Namibia. Namibia won the one-day series 2–1, but lost both three-day games. A return visit to Zimbabwe the following January saw Namibia win a five match one-day series against Zimbabwe A 4–1, also winning a match against Zimbabwe Under-19s. Bangladesh toured Namibia in February, winning all three one-day games and drawing the three-day game. Following this, Namibia travelled to the United Arab Emirates for the 2004 ICC Six Nations Challenge. They finished third on run rate after beating Canada, the Netherlands and the UAE and losing to Scotland and the USA. Namibia played two ICC Intercontinental Cup matches against Kenya and Uganda in 2004, losing them both. In between the two matches, they won an African nations tournament in Zambia. Later in the year, they took part in Zimbabwe's national one-day domestic competition, in which they finished as runners-up. Whilst in Zimbabwe, they won two matches against the national side. This was followed by a visit to Namibia by England, who won both matches.

Zimbabwe A again visited Namibia in early 2005, losing both one-day matches that finished. Pakistan A were the next visitors in April, winning all three one-day matches and drawing in the three-day game. This was followed by their two regional group games in the 2005 ICC Intercontinental Cup. Whilst they were unbeaten, winning against Uganda and drawing against Kenya, this was not enough to qualify for the semi-finals. They then visited Ireland to take part in the 2005 ICC Trophy. They finished 7th after beating Denmark in their final play-off game. Back at home, they hosted New Zealand at the end of July, losing both games, losing by only 29 runs after conceding 330/6. In October of that year, they hosted the semi-finals of the Intercontinental Cup, despite failing to qualify. While the final was being played, they played a two match one-day series against Bermuda after they had been knocked out of the tournament, winning both games, but the games were tarnished by controversial incidents, with the Bermuda team accusing the Namibian team of racist insults, and walking off in the second game when a flurry of bouncers were unleashed at the lower order Bermuda batsmen. The Namibian Cricket Board denied the allegations of racism.

In March 2006, Namibia met Nepal in a challenge match to decide who got the eighth and final spot in the 2006 ICC Intercontinental Cup. The match was drawn, with Namibia getting a first innings lead, thus qualifying them for the main tournament. The main tournament itself started with an innings defeat by Scotland in Aberdeen before a five wicket defeat by Ireland in Dublin, both matches in May. In the 2006-07 South African cricket season, Namibia took part in the second tier of first-class and List A cricket, the South African Airways Challenge. They finished second in their group in the three-day tournament and third in their group in the one-day tournament, missing out on reaching the semi-finals by one win. In the midst of the matches in those tournaments, they played their third and final 2006 Intercontinental Cup match, beating the UAE by an innings. On 1 April 2007, they became part of the ICC's High Performance Program.

In November/December 2007, Namibia hosted Division Two of the World Cricket League where they played against Argentina, Denmark, Oman, the UAE and Uganda. Although Namibia won three of their five group matches, it was not enough for them to progress to the final. Namibia beat Denmark in the third place playoff. On the basis of their top four finish in this tournament, Namibia qualified for the ICC World Cup Qualifier in 2009, the final tournament in qualification for the 2011 World Cup.

Namibia again took part in the second tier of South African domestic cricket between October 2007 and February 2008. They played a 2007-08 ICC Intercontinental Cup match against Canada in October 2007, playing the remaining games against Bermuda, Ireland, Kenya, the Netherlands, Scotland and the UAE in 2008.

Namibia won the 2009–10 ICC Intercontinental Shield defeating the United Arab Emirates by six wickets in Dubai.
In 2011 Namibia participated in Division Two and finished as runners-up, on this occasion behind the UAE.

In July 2011, the country competed in the ICC Twenty20 World Cricket League Africa Division One competition in Uganda, winning all eight group matches before succumbing to the hosts in the Final by six wickets. During this tournament, all-rounder Louis van der Westhuizen struck 16 sixes in an innings of 159* against Kenya, as part of a team total of 262/1 from 20 overs.

The Golden Generation
In April 2018, the ICC decided to grant full Twenty20 International (T20I) status to all its members. Therefore, all Twenty20 matches played between Namibia and other ICC members since 1 January 2019 have been full T20Is.
Namibia's first T20I match was against Ghana on 20 May 2019 in the Regional Final of the 2018–19 ICC World Twenty20 Africa Qualifier tournament.

In July 2020, the Namibia Men's team won the ICC Associate Member Men's Performance of the Year award, after gaining One Day International (ODI) status, in the ICC's Annual Development Awards to recognise developing cricketing nations.

Namibia qualified for the 2021 ICC T20 World Cup in the United Arab Emirates when they finished 4th in the 2019 ICC Men's T20 World Cup Qualifier tournament in October and November 2019. They lost their first match against Sri Lanka but recorded a historic first-ever win at a World Cup event when they beat The Netherlands by 6 wickets in Abu Dhabi on 20 October 2021. On 22 October 2021 in the next match against Ireland, Namibia made history by winning the match by 8 wickets and qualified for the Super 12 stage of the tournament. On 27 October 2021, in the first Super 12 match for Namibia, they registered another historic win when they beat Scotland by 4 wickets.

In the 2022 ICC T20 World Cup, Namibia defeated Asia Cup champions and world number 8 side Sri Lanka in a stunning upset to open the tournament.

International grounds

Records
International match summary – Namibia

Last updated 25 February 2023

One-Day Internationals
Highest team total: 324/7 v. Oman on 8 January 2020 at Oman Cricket Academy, Al Amarat.
Highest individual score: 136, Jean-Pierre Kotze v. United States on 20 September 2019 at Central Broward Regional Park, Lauderhill.
Best individual bowling figures: 6/42, Tangeni Lungameni v. Papua New Guinea on 26 November 2022 at Wanderers, Windhoek.

Most ODI runs for Namibia

Most ODI wickets for Namibia

ODI record versus other nations

Records complete to ODI #4522. Last updated 25 February 2023.

Twenty20 Internationals

 Highest team total: 240/3 v. Botswana on 20 August 2019 at United Ground, Windhoek.
 Highest individual score: 101*, Jean-Pierre Kotze v. Botswana on 20 August 2019 at United Ground, Windhoek.
 Best individual bowling figures: 6/10, JJ Smit v. Uganda on 10 April 2022 at United Ground, Windhoek.

Most T20I runs for Namibia

Most T20I wickets for Namibia

T20I record versus other nations

Records complete to T20I #1836. Last updated 20 October 2022.

Tournament history

ICC Cricket World Cup

ICC T20 World Cup

ICC Cricket World Cup Qualifier
Namibia did not play in the ICC Trophy between 1979 and 1990 as they were not a member of the ICC at the time.

1994: 9th place – Won Plate competition
1997: 15th place
2001: Runners up
2005: 7th place
2009: 8th place
2014: 6th place
2018: Did not qualify
2023: TBD

ICC T20 World Cup Qualifier
 2012: 3rd place
 2013: 10th place
 2015: 7th place
 2019: 4th place

ICC Intercontinental Cup
 2004: First round
 2005: First round
 2006: First round
 2007–08: Losing finalist
 2009–10 (Shield): Winners
 2011–13: 5th place
 2015–17: 8th place

ICC World Cricket League
2007 Division Two: 3rd place
2011 Division Two: 2nd place
2011–13 Championship: 7th place
2015 Division Two: 2nd place
2015–17 Championship: 8th place
2018 Division Two: 4th place
2019 Division Two: Winners

ICC 6 Nations Challenge
2000: Did not participate
2002: 1st place
2004: 3rd place

Current squad

This is the list of players who were picked in the most recent ODI or T20I squads. Updated as on 7 December 2022

Coaching staff

Overseas/foreign players

Namibians playing overseas

A complete list of Namibian cricketers with  articles can be found at: Category:Namibian cricketers

See also
 Cricket in Namibia
 List of Namibia ODI cricketers
 List of Namibia Twenty20 International cricketers
 List of Namibian first-class cricketers
 Namibia national under-19 cricket team
 Namibia women's national cricket team

Notes

References

Further reading
 South African Cricket Annual – various editions
 Wisden Cricketers' Almanack – various editions
 Cricket Namibia official site

Cricket in Namibia
National cricket teams
Cricket
Namibia in international cricket